The 2014 Levene Gouldin & Thompson Tennis Challenger was a professional tennis tournament played on hard court. It was the 21st edition of the tournament which was part of the 2014 ATP Challenger Tour. It took place in Binghamton, United States between 14 and 20 July 2014.

Singles main-draw entrants

Seeds

 1 Rankings are as of July 8, 2014.

Other entrants
The following players received wildcards into the singles main draw:
  Marcos Giron
  Austin Krajicek
  Winston Lin
  Ryan Shane

The following players received entry from the qualifying draw:
  Sekou Bangoura
  Marius Copil
  Raymond Sarmiento
  Daniel Nguyen

Champions

Men's singles 

  Sergiy Stakhovsky def.  Wayne Odesnik 6–4, 7–6(11–9)

Men's doubles 

  Daniel Cox /  Daniel Smethurst def.  Marius Copil /  Sergiy Stakhovsky 6–7(3–7), 6–2, [10–6]

External links
Official Website

 
Levene Gouldin and Thompson Tennis Challenger
Levene Gouldin & Thompson Tennis Challenger
Levene Gouldin and Thompson Tennis Challenger
2014 in sports in New York (state)